Andrew Maynard may refer to:

Andrew Maynard (boxer) (born 1964), American boxer
Andrew D. Maynard (born 1965), American scientist
Andrew M. Maynard (born 1962), Connecticut state senator